Avane Srimannarayana is the feature film soundtrack for the 2019 film of the same name composed by Charan Raj and B. Ajaneesh Loknath. Ajaneesh also provided the background score, in collaboration with the Macedonian Symphonic Orchestra. The film has four songs in the Kannada version, two songs in both Telugu and Tamil version and one song in Malayalam and Hindi version.

The film's lead single "Hands Up" was released in all five versions on 13 December 2019, the same day as the rest of the soundtrack. The soundtrack featured lyrics written by Nagarjuna Sharma, Vivek, Ramajogayya Sastry, Sudamsu and Raqueeb Alam for the respective versions.

Production 
Originally, Charan Raj was announced in the film's team, composing music for the film, with his name being credited in the first poster. Later B. Ajaneesh Loknath, was also hired to provide the score and songs. According to producer Pushkara Mallikarjuna, he stated "The film has four songs in total. Usually, the movie songs will be given more importance for shooting. But we decided to shoot the whole picture as exclusive. Each shot is unique, which contains more details. The movie will be released in different languages, so we shot in a way it should reach all kind of audience."

Ajaneesh, who produced the background music for the film, worked with an orchestra from Macedonia, Greece. This marked the first time that background music for a Kannada film was recorded in Europe. In an interview with The Times of India, Ajaneesh explained, "We have recorded parts of the background music in Macedonia, Europe. It is not that we don't have musicians here, but we wanted a big orchestra with a string and horn section specifically. So, we decided to get the theme songs recorded from this team in Macedonia. This group has recorded with A. R. Rahman sir on earlier occasions. Having an epic project like Avane Srimannarayana, required an orchestra of such magnitude."

The background score of the film has multiple cultural inferences. Ajaneesh further stated that "Music plays a pivotal part in the movie, and the background score is a mix of music associated with Indian mythology, Carnatic music, and western classical with Arabic influences. While we were inspired by the themes for iconic Hollywood characters like Sherlock Holmes and Jack Sparrow, the score we have composed is original. We have about seven themes and these move with the narrative. Audiences will be able to connect and form parallels between the music and the storyline. I have also composed two songs for the film. One is an introduction song that plays out in a fight sequence at a pub. The tune has middle-eastern influences as well as the peppy strains that one would associate with cowboys. And since the storyline is set in the 1980s, I have tried to bring in an old school flavour. The song is in chaste Kannada, thanks to the lovely lyrics by Nagarjuna. The second track is a climax number, which signifies an important moment for the protagonist Narayana. The song is partly in Mayamalavagowla raga, and also has a middle-eastern strain."

Release 
Since the makers decided not to tie with any other music labels, Rakshit Shetty released the album through Divo, a digital streaming portal. The rights to stream the album were bought by Gaana, through their online music streaming platform.

The film's lead single "Hands Up" was released in all five versions on 13 December 2019. It was sung by Vijay Prakash with backing vocals by Shashank Sheshagiri, Pancham Jeeva and Chethan Naik, with lyrics by Nagarjuna Sharma for the original version, Vivek for the Tamil version, Ramajogayya Sastry for the Telugu version, Sudamsu for the Malayalam version and Raqueeb Alam for the Hindi version. The same day, the makers unveiled the soundtrack album in all five languages.

Track listing

Kannada

Tamil

Telugu

Malayalam

Hindi

Background score 
The background score of the film was released on 6 June 2020, coinciding with Rakshit Shetty's birthday. It was released as a jukebox format in YouTube, as well as in all music streaming platforms. It has 17 tracks composed by B. Ajaneesh Loknath.

References 

Kannada film soundtracks
Telugu film soundtracks
Malayalam film soundtracks
Hindi film soundtracks
2019 soundtrack albums
Fantasy film soundtracks
Adventure film soundtracks
Comedy film soundtracks
B. Ajaneesh Lokanath soundtracks